Vasco da Gama, often shortened to Vasco, is a city in the state of Goa on the west coast of India. It is named after the Portuguese explorer Vasco da Gama. It is the headquarters of the Mormugão taluka (subdistrict).

The city was founded in 1543 and remained in Portuguese hands until 1961, when Goa ceased to be a Portuguese territory. The 1888-constructed Mormugao Port remains a busy shipping route in Asia. It is one of the major ports of independent India. The shipbuilding area of Goa Shipyard Limited that builds Indian Navy and Coast Guard vessels was also built there in 1957 (during the Portuguese era). Initially built around the city's harbour as the 'Estaleiros Navais de Goa', the area has, since the end of Portuguese presence, expanded into construction for several other branches of maritime patrol and security. The Indian Navy has an obvious presence here, with its vast campuses and ports, which include the naval base INS Hansa.

History

This city, in the former Portuguese territory of Goa, is named after the famous Portuguese explorer and navigator Vasco da Gama, who held the title of Governor of Portuguese India. This city serves as the headquarters of the Mormugao sub-district. It was founded in 1543 and remained in Portuguese hands until 1961, when the territory was lost to India.

Vasco da Gama, 1st Count of Vidigueira was the first European to reach India by sea. His initial voyage to India (1497–1499) was the first to link Europe and Asia by an ocean route, connecting the Atlantic and the Indian oceans and, in this way, the West and the East. He reached Goa on 11 September 1524 but died at Kochi three months later. His remains were eventually returned to Portugal and interred at St Jeronimos monastery.

The city is sometimes referred to as Sambhaji Nagar. Sambhaji was the eldest son of Shivaji, the founder of the Maratha Empire. An attempt was made to change the city's name to Sambhaji Nagar, and this is reflected in a few government records. However, no official records have been found as to when the city was renamed. It is thus dismissed as a political move.

Renovation of Clock Tower

In 2015, after a campaign by the Goa Heritage Action Group and the History Lovers Group, the Mormugao Municipal Council (MMC) decided to renovate the clock tower of the municipal market in the heart of the city. Built in 1938, the complex is an example of Art Deco style of architecture. The renovation work was completed in 2017 with funding provided by the Rajaram and Tarabai Bandekar Charitable Trust, and the clock was brought in from Nashik.

Transport 
Vasco is connected by road by the National Highway 17A & National Highway 17B, by rail by the Vasco da Gama railway station, by the sea through the Mormugao Port and by air through Dabolim Airport, thus serving as the main hub for most tourists visiting the state of Goa.

Sports

As in the rest of Goa, football is the most popular sport in Vasco. Two teams from the town have participated in the I-League – Vasco Sports Club and Salgaocar Sports Club. Salgaocar SC were Champions of the 1998–99 season of the erstwhile NFL. Tilak Maidan is a 6,000-seater football ground located in the city, hosts Indian Super League matches. The stadium sporting a magnificent turf hosted I-league matches during April 2013, as the home ground for the four teams from Goa in the league, when Fatorda Stadium was closed down for renovation.

Although cricket is not as popular as football, a Vasco resident Shadab Jakati plays for Goa in the Ranji Trophy first-class competition and has also been selected to play for the Chennai Super Kings IPL franchise. Railway Stadium is a cricket ground in Vasco da Gama. The only recorded match held on the ground was a first-class match between Goa and Kerala in the 1986/87 Ranji Trophy, which Kerala won by 6 wickets.

Politics
The city of Vasco falls under the boundaries of the South Goa (Lok Sabha constituency) previously Mormugao Lok Sabha constituency in the Lok Sabha. The current Member of Parliament is Francisco Sardinha of the Indian National Congress.

The extended city of Vasco / Mormugao elects three representatives to the Goa Legislative Assembly:
 Mormugao: The current MLA is Sankalp Amonkar of the BJP.
 Vasco da Gama: The current MLA is Krishna Salkar of the BJP.
 Dabolim: The current MLA is Mauvin Godinho of the BJP.

Research
The National Centre for Antarctic and Ocean Research (NCAOR) located at Headland Sada is a research and development institution administered by the Ministry of Earth Sciences. It is responsible for administering the Indian Antarctic Program and maintains the Indian government's Antarctic research station, Maitri. In addition to laboratories for marine sample processing/analyses, it hosts a special low-temperature ice core sample storage facility. It is also the nodal agency for Indian scientific participation in the deep sea drilling research under the aegis of International Ocean Discovery Program (IODP).

Education
 The Birla Institute of Technology & Science, Pilani started its second campus BITS Pilani Goa Campus at Zuarinagar in Vasco da Gama. The campus offers undergraduate and postgraduate courses in engineering and science.
 The Navy Children School, established in 1987 under the aegis of Naval Education Society, is located in Vasco-da-Gama. It is one of eight similar institutions in India.
 The city has two Kendriya Vidyalayas, established under the aegis of the Indian Navy. Both are located at Mangor Hill in the Varunapuri compound.
 Mormugao Educational Society's College of Arts and Commerce, locally known as MES College, is an institution in Zuarinagar, Vasco-da-Gama which provides training in commerce and the arts.
 Mormugao Port Trust also runs three schools at the Primary, Secondary and Higher Secondary levels named Deepvihar.
 New Dawn Ashadeep School is a special school for the physically disabled.

Gallery

References

External links 
 
 
 
Goa limestone

 
Cities and towns in South Goa district
Populated places established in 1543
1543 establishments in the Portuguese Empire
Mormugao